Roman Lutsenko (born 20 January 1985) is a professional Ukrainian football midfielder.

Career
He played for Metalurh Zaporizhya in the Ukrainian Premier League. Lutsenko debuted for the Metalurh Zaporizhya senior team on 26 April 2008 during a home game in the Ukrainian Premier League against rivals Arsenal Kyiv, which the team lost 1–0.

External links
Profile on Official Metalurh Zaporizhya Website
Profile on EUFO
Profile on Football Squads

1985 births
Living people
People from Hlukhiv
Ukrainian footballers
Ukraine student international footballers
FC Metalurh Zaporizhzhia players
FC Chornomorets Odesa players
FC Zirka Kropyvnytskyi players
FC Nyva Vinnytsia players
FC Nyva Bershad players
MFC Mykolaiv players
FC Desna Chernihiv players
Association football midfielders
FC Moscow players
Sportspeople from Sumy Oblast